Fairview is a town in Union County, North Carolina, United States. The town incorporated in 2001. The population was 3,463 at the 2020 Census. Fairview has one elementary school, one service station, a volunteer fire department, a small chain dollar store, and a community park.

Demographics

2020 census

As of the 2020 United States census, there were 3,463 people, 1,451 households, and 1,046 families residing in the town.

Geography 
Fairview is located in the foothills of the Uwharrie Mountains. Tyler Knob is the highest point at 849 feet at its peak, sitting on the Fairview-Unionville town line. The Rocky River runs through Fairview along the higher foothills of the Uwharrie Mountains.

External links

References

Towns in North Carolina
Towns in Union County, North Carolina
Populated places established in 2001
2001 establishments in North Carolina